The Alagoas antwren (Myrmotherula snowi) is a species of bird in the family Thamnophilidae. It is endemic to Brazil.

Habitat 
The Alagoas antwren is found in subtropical or tropical moist lowland in a 230 km2 range at 500–790 m elevation in Brazil, across Murici, Mata do Estado, and Serra do Urubu.

Conservation 
The Alagoas antwren is considered critically endangered, with a population estimated at fewer than 30 individuals as of 2014. Additionally, this population is thought to be decreasing due to farming, ranching, logging, and urban development within its range. As of 2018, there are concerns that a lack of recent records outside of Murici suggests that the population outside of it has severely decreased if not disappeared.

References

External links

BirdLife Species Factsheet.

Myrmotherula
Birds of the Atlantic Forest
Endemic birds of Brazil
Critically endangered animals
Critically endangered biota of South America
Birds described in 1983
Taxonomy articles created by Polbot